Catherine Havasi (born 1981) is an American scientist who specialises in artificial intelligence (AI) at MIT Media Lab. She is co-founder and CEO of AI company Luminoso. Havasi was a member of the  MIT group engaged in   the  Open Mind Common Sense (also known as OMCS) AI project and that created the natural language AI program ConceptNet.

Early life and education 

Havasi grew up in Pittsburgh and became interested in artificial intelligence from reading Marvin Minsky's 1986 book The Society of Mind.  She  attended the Massachusetts Institute of Technology, where she became involved in the MIT Media Lab and studied under Minsky. She received a Ph.D in computer science from Brandeis University.

Career 
In 1999, she became involved in the MIT project Open Mind Common Sense  with Minsky and Push Singh, and was part of  a team that created ConceptNet, an open-source semantic network based on the information in the OMCS database.

In 2010,  Havasi was among the team that founded Luminoso, a text analytics software company building on the work of ConceptNet.

Havasi was named among Boston Business Journal'''s "40 Under 40", of business and civic leaders making a major impact in their respective fields in 2014.  Fast Company included her in its "100 Most Creative People in Business 2015" listing.

She is co-author of 7 peer-reviewed journal articles on AI and language, and many per-reviewed major conference presentations,

 Selected publications 

 Most cited publication 

 Cambria, Erik, Bjorn Schuller, Yunqing Xia, and Catherine Havasi. "New avenues in opinion mining and sentiment analysis." IEEE Journal of Intelligent Systems 28, no. 2 (2013): 15-21. (cited 701 times according to Google Scholar as of 24 September 2018) 
Havasi, Catherine, Robert Speer, and Jason Alonso. "ConceptNet 3: a flexible, multilingual semantic network for common sense knowledge." In Recent advances in natural language processing, Borovets, Bulgaria, September 2007.  pp. 27-29.Philadelphia, PA: John Benjamins, 2007.  (cited 341 times according to Google Scholar as of 24 September 2018) 
Speer, Robert, and Catherine Havasi. "Representing General Relational Knowledge in ConceptNet 5."In LREC, pp. 3679–3686. 2012. (cited 227 times according to Google Scholar as of 24 September 2018)

 Other publications 

Catherine Havasi, Robert Speer, James Pustejovsky, and Henry Lieberman.'Digital Intuition: Applying Common Sense Using Dimensionality Reduction. IEEE Journal of Intelligent Systems, 24(4) July 2009. (cited 97 times according to Google Scholar as of 24 September 2018) 
 Robert Speer, Catherine Havasi, and Henry Lieberman.AnalogySpace: Reducing the dimensionality of common sense knowledge.'' Proceedings of AAAI  vol. 8, pp. 548–553.2008, July 2008. (cited 193 times according to Google Scholar as of 24 September 2018)

References

Living people
Artificial intelligence researchers
American consciousness researchers and theorists
1981 births
American computer scientists
Massachusetts Institute of Technology alumni
Scientists from Pittsburgh
American women computer scientists
American women in business
21st-century American women scientists